The Speaker is the presiding officer of the National Assembly in Guyana. The post was created in 1966 when the National Assembly came into being, although previous legislatures including the Legislative Council, House of Assembly, and the Legislative Assembly also had Speakers.

The position of Speaker was introduced in 1953 following constitutional reforms that created the House of Assembly. The Speaker was initially appointed by the Governor, but following the 1961 constitutional reforms, was elected by members of the legislature. The first elected Speaker, Rahman Baccus Gajraj, was not a member of the Legislative Assembly. The second, Aubrey Percival Alleyne, was a member of the House of Assembly, and after election as Speaker, resigned from his role as an elected member and was replaced by the next person on the party's list.

The Speaker initially wore a full-bottomed wig and ceremonial gown, with the practice ceasing in 1969. The Speaker's Chair was a gift from the Government of India on 15 November 1966 to celebrate Guyanese independence.

List of speakers

Note 
Jagan died in office. Deputy speaker, Clarissa Riehl, served as acting speaker 15–23 October 2000 until a successor was elected.

References

Lists of political office-holders in Guyana
Guyana